Kléber is a station of the Paris Métro serving Line 6 at the intersection of Avenue Kléber and the Avenue des Portugais in the 16th arrondissement.

The station opened on 2 October 1900 as a branch of Line 1 from Étoile to Trocadéro. On 5 November 1903 this line was extended to Passy and the line from Étoile to Trocadéro and Passy became known as Line 2 South as part of a planned ring line around central Paris to be built under or over the boulevards built in place of the demolished Wall of the Farmers-General; this circle is now operated as two lines: 2 and 6. On 14 October 1907 the line from Étoile to Trocadéro, Place d'Italie and Gare du Nord became part of Line 5. On 6 October 1942 the section of Line 5 from Étoile to Place d'Italie, including Boissière, was transferred to Line 6. Avenue Kléber commemorates Jean Baptiste Kléber (1753–1800), a General in the Revolutionary and Napoleonic Wars, particularly noted for his leadership in the Egyptian campaign, where he was assassinated.

Although Charles de Gaulle - Étoile is designated as the terminus of Line 6, the single track loop at Charles de Gaulle - Étoile limits the capacity of Line 6 at that station. Instead of having an extended terminal stop at Charles de Gaulle - Étoile, Line 6 trains depart quickly back round the loop and then stop for an extended period of time at Kléber, which has extra platforms and tracks to accommodate the arrangement.

Station layout

Gallery

References
 Roland, Gérard (2003). Stations de métro. D’Abbesses à Wagram. Éditions Bonneton.

Paris Métro stations in the 16th arrondissement of Paris
Railway stations in France opened in 1900